Homy Hogs was a Swedish punk band, active from 1979 to 1982 and reunited on different occasions during the 80s.
They are counted as the true Swedish pioneers in HC-punk together with bands like Headcleaners, Anti Cimex, Missbrukarna and Shitlickers. This considers their first two releases, the album Noje For Nekrofiler from 1981 and the EP Smash Overdose from 1982. Thereafter, the band played in a more regular punkrock style. They also made some appearances and an album under the name Werewolves on Wheels, taken from the title on their second album.

Band members

1979-1982
LT Hog - Guitar
Gordis - Bass
Palle Krüger - Drums
Kirran Hitler-Lenin - Vocals (1979-1980)
Stanke Stankeviecz - vocals (1980)
Pettan Enoga - vocals (1980-1981)
Drulle Moschta - vocals (1981-1982)

1983-1984
LT Hog - Vocals
Gordis - Drums
Palle Krüger - Guitar
Pettan Enoga - Guitar
Porra Lindengren - Bass

1984-1988
LT Hog - Vocals/Guitar
Gordis - Drums
Porra Lindengren - Guitar
Nandor Hegedüs - Bass/Vocals (Also in TST)

Discography

Studio albums
Nöje for nekrofiler (1981)
Werewolves on Wheels (Demo-album) (1986)
Werewolves on Wheels versus everything that moves (1988)

Cassette-EP
Smash Overdose (1982)

EP's
Homy Hogs wanna destroy (1983)
Rokker Triplane/High Drive (1988)
Rokker Triplane  (1-sided on cirkular sawblade) (1992)
 Tonight Alright (Split with Union Carbide Productions & G.O.L.D.)(King Kong EP-series 3, 1992) 
Smash Overdose (Split with Fylgja) (2008)

12"
Homy Hogs wanna destroy (1987)
Demolition Beat/I wanna destroy (1988)

Compilations
Youthanasia II  (1984)
Killed by Hardcore vol. 3  (1989) 
Hardcore History vol. 7 (unknown)
Hardcore History vol. 10 (unknown)
Bloodstains Across The World #4 (unknown)
Bloodstains Across The World #5 (2019) (As The Incredible Hogs)

References

Literature
 Peter Jandreus. 2008. The Encyclopedia of Swedish Punk 1977-1987. Stockholm: Premium Publishing.
 Peter Kagerland. 2012. Ny Våg: Svensk Punk/New Wave/Synth 1977-1982. Stockholm: Premium Publishing.

External links
 Homy Hogs on Swedish Punk Fanzines
 Dagens Nyheter, 2016-12-01. Punkquis: Vad kan du om Stockholmsbanden? (Punkquis: What do you know about the Stockholm punk bands?) 
 Aftonbladet, 2016-09-24. Punksinglarna som är värda tusenlappar (The punk singles that are worth thousands)
 Homy Hogs on Discogs
 List with Swedish punk rock records 
Swedish punk rock groups